Saint-Généroux is a commune in the Deux-Sèvres department in western France.

It is situated on the river Thouet some 15 km upstream from the town of Thouars.

See also
Communes of the Deux-Sèvres department

References

Communes of Deux-Sèvres